The 1968–69 UC Irvine Anteaters men's basketball team represented the University of California, Irvine during the 1968–69 NCAA College Division men's basketball season. The Anteaters were led by second year head coach Dick Davis and played their home games at Crawford Hall. The anteaters finished the season with a record 19–9.

Previous season
The 1966–67 UC Irvine Anteaters finished with a record of 20–8 under first year coach Dick Davis.

Roster

Schedule

|-
!colspan=9 style=|Regular Season

|-
!colspan=12 style="background:#;"| NCAA Tournament

Source

References

UC Irvine Anteaters men's basketball seasons
UC Irvine Anteaters
UC Irvine Anteaters